David Berthezène (born 27 October 1980) is a French former professional rugby league footballer.

Career
Berthezène played for the Catalans Dragons and the Salford City Reds in the Super League competition. His position of choice is hooker.

At the international level, Berthezène has also represented both France and, starting in 2009, Catalonia.

1980 births
Living people
Catalans Dragons players
Catalonia national rugby league team players
France national rugby league team players
French rugby league players
Rugby league hookers
Salford Red Devils players